Switzerland recognized Israel on January 25, 1949 and opened a consulate in Tel Aviv. Israel has an embassy in Bern. Since 1958, Switzerland has an embassy in Tel Aviv and an honorary consulate in Eilat.

History

The First Zionist Congress was held in Basel in 1897, and 15 out of a total of 22 congresses were held in Switzerland. Before the establishment of the State of Israel, Switzerland maintained a consulate in Jerusalem and a consular agency in Tel Aviv. It recognized the new state in 1949 and opened a consulate in Tel Aviv, which was upgraded to an embassy in 1958. The Swiss community in Israel is the largest in the Asian region, totalling around 12,000 persons.

After escalation of the Middle East conflict, Switzerland halted arms sales and military cooperation with Israel from 2002 to 2005. Since 2004, there has been regular political dialogue between Switzerland and Israel.

Switzerland has represented Israel's interests in numerous countries (Hungary (1967–1989), Guinea (1967–1973), Ceylon/Sri Lanka (1970–1976), Madagascar (1973–1994), Liberia (1973–1983) and Ghana (1973–2002)). Conversely, it has represented the interests of Iran (1958–1987) and the Ivory Coast (1973–1986) in Israel. It also lobbied successfully for inclusion of Magen David Adom in the Red Cross and Red Crescent movement.

On 21 April 2009, Israeli officials, angered by a meeting between Swiss President Hans-Rudolf Merz and the Iranian president, recalled its ambassador to Switzerland, Ilan Elgar "for consultations" amid ongoing controversy over an  anti-racism conference in Geneva, Switzerland.

In December 2014 Israel protested Switzerland's announcement that it will host a meeting of countries that have signed the Fourth Geneva Convention to discuss the situation of the Gaza Strip, the West Bank and Jerusalem.

See also
 Foreign relations of Israel
 Foreign relations of Switzerland
 History of the Jews in Switzerland
 International recognition of Israel

References

External links
 Israeli embassy in Bern (in French, German and Italian only)
  Swiss Department of Foreign Affairs about the relation with Israel
 Swiss embassy in Tel Aviv

 
Switzerland
Bilateral relations of Switzerland